Lišće prekriva Lisabon is the second studio album by the Serbian/Yugoslavian new wave band Električni Orgazam. It was released in 1982 by Jugoton.

Track listing

"A" side
"Pođimo"
"Alabama" (trumpet — Pero Ugrin)
"Žuto"
"Sam"
"Glave"
"Devojke"
"Afrika"
"Podstanar"
"Leptir" (trumpet — Pero Ugrin)

"B" side
"Bomba"
"Nezgodno"
"Razgovori"
"Ona"
"Znam"
"Četvoro"
"Odelo"
"Dokolica"

Personnel
Grof (Jovan Jovanović) — bass guitar
Goran Čavajda — drums, percussion
Ljubomir Jovanović — guitar
Srđan Gojković — guitar, vocals
Ljubomir Đukić — keyboards, vocals

References

External links

Električni Orgazam albums
1982 albums
Psychedelic rock albums by Serbian artists
Psychedelic rock albums by Yugoslav artists
Jugoton albums
Albums recorded in Slovenia